Horonu (also, Orony) is a village and municipality in the Yardymli Rayon of Azerbaijan.  It has a population of 519.

References 

Populated places in Yardimli District